Elections to the French National Assembly were held in Mauritania on 17 June 1951. Mauritania had one seat in the Assembly, which was won by Sidi el-Mokhtar N'Diaye, a member of the Mauritanian Progressive Union. He defeated the incumbent, Horma Ould Babana, who had been elected as a member of the French Section of the Workers' International in the last election, but had since gone on to leave the SFIO and form his own party, the Mauritanian Entente.

Background
The UPM was a conservative and regionally based organisation that had been expressly formed in order to oppose Babana's Mauritanian Entente. The party was supported by the colonial administration and its allies, the traditional Maure secular and clerical ruling classes, who feared the Mauritanian Entente's "socialist" program. Babana had spent much of his five-year term in Paris, resulting in him becoming disconnected from the changing Mauritanian political climate, and contributing to a sense of alienation from him amongst Mauritanians. This was reinforced by his strong defence of Moorish interests, which served to alienate black Mauritanians, and also by his disinterest in Mauritanian independence.

Results

References

Mauritania
1951 in Mauritania
Elections in Mauritania
June 1951 events in Africa